Auguste Sophie Friederike Marie Caroline Julie of Hesse-Kassel (30 October 1823 – 17 July 1889), known as Princess Augusta, was a Princess of Hesse-Cassel, a daughter of  Prince William of Hesse-Kassel (1787–1867) and Princess Charlotte of Denmark (1789-1864). She spent most of her life in Denmark.

Family
Princess Augusta was born in Copenhagen as the youngest child of Prince William of Hesse, a son of Prince Frederick of Hesse-Kassel and Princess Caroline of Nassau-Usingen and Princess Charlotte of Denmark, a daughter of Hereditary Prince Frederick of Denmark and Norway (1753–1805) and Duchess Sophia Frederica of Mecklenburg-Schwerin (1758–1794). She was thus a niece of king Christian VIII of Denmark. Her sister was Louise of Hesse-Kassel, later Queen of Denmark and mother to King Frederick VIII of Denmark, Queen Alexandra of The United Kingdom, King George I of Greece and Empress Maria Feodorovna of Russia.

Her other siblings included her oldest sister Princess Marie Luise Charlotte of Hesse-Kassel and her only brother Prince Frederick William of Hesse-Kassel (1820-1884), Head of the House of Hesse-Kassel after the death of the last elector of Hesse-Kassel, Frederick William, Elector of Hesse, who died without any legitimate issue.

Augustas father, Prince William, who was a minor prince of Hesse-Cassel, had moved to Denmark prior to his marriage to Princess Charlotte and Augusta and her siblings grew up in the Danish royal court and the family became one of the leading families in Danish society. The family became even more important when it became clear that the main line of the Danish royal house faced extinction. Augusta and her siblings were among the closest relatives of King Christian VIII and thus they had a strong claim to the throne. Due to various circumstances it was Augusta's brother-in-law, Christian IX of Denmark, who in the end became king when the main line died out in 1863.

Marriage
Princess Augusta married the Danish politician and Danish-Swedish nobleman, Carl Frederik Blixen-Finecke, baron Blixen-Finecke in 1854. He held the family seat at Näsbyholm Castle in Sweden and Dallund manor in Funen and served as Danish Minister of Foreign Affairs in 1859–1860. The marriage produced two sons. The marriage was regarded with great distress in Augusta's family because Carl was married with two children when they fell in love and he divorced his wife to marry Augusta. He was furthermore of much lower rank than Augusta and later his political views were far from the views of her family. He also became a close ally of Countess Louise of Danner, the morganatic spouse of King Frederick VII of Denmark, who was disliked by the other members of the Danish royal family. Augusta and Carl had a very happy marriage despite the obstacles and they were known for their hospitality and lavish lifestyle. As a tribute to Augusta, Carl took the motto "Per Angusta ad Augusta," which is latin for "through difficulties to honors."

Last years
Princess Augusta became a widow in 1873. She lived for many years in "Villa Augusta" in the town of Helsingør north of Copenhagen. She lived privately at the villa, but she was often visited by the royal family, including emperor Alexander III of Russia, when they stayed at Fredensborg Palace. She died at the Amalienborg Palace in 1889.

References

Citations

Bibliography

External links 

1823 births
1889 deaths
People from Copenhagen
House of Hesse-Kassel